She Speeds is a song by Dunedin, New Zealand band Straitjacket Fits. The song was released on their debut 'Life in One Chord EP' in 1987. The EP was recorded at the Lab Studios in Auckland, New Zealand and reached number 10 on the NZ Top 40 charts later that year. A video was filmed for She Speeds for just $250 by Johnny Ogilvy and the song quickly became a cornerstone of their live sets.  The song would later be dropped from their sets as the band moved away from its early sound.

"She Speeds" was the last song played by the band at the Auckland Big Day Out in 1994. The band went on semi-permanent hiatus after this show. At a show during their 2005 reunion tour, Shayne Carter humorously murmured 'Uh-oh suppose this had to happen' before launching into the opening riff of the song.

"She Speeds" is number 9 on the APRA Top 100 New Zealand Songs of All Time as voted by APRA members.

Drummer John Collie said in 2008 that after listening to a live recording of their 2005 reunion tour, "She Speeds" along with "Dialling a Prayer" were still the best songs the band recorded during their career.

References

External links
Video of 'She Speeds'
 Tribute to Straitjacket Fits and She Speeds from the 2008 NZ Music Award

Further reading

APRA Award winners
Flying Nun Records singles
Straitjacket Fits songs